ABC2 was a digital television channel as part of the Australian Broadcasting Corporation, which has been branded as ABC TV Plus since 2021.

ABC2 may also refer to one of the following television stations in the United States affiliated with the American Broadcasting Company:

Current affiliates
KATN, Fairbanks, Alaska
KATU, Portland, Oregon
KMID-TV, Midland/Odessa, Texas
KQTV, St. Joseph, Missouri
KTWO-TV, Casper/Riverton, Wyoming
WBAY-TV, Green Bay, Wisconsin
WBRZ-TV, Baton Rouge, Louisiana
WKRN-TV, Nashville, Tennessee
WMAR-TV, Baltimore, Maryland
WSB-TV, Atlanta, Georgia

Formerly affiliated
KREM, Spokane, Washington (1954 to 1976)
KENI-TV (now KTUU-TV), Anchorage, Alaska (1953 to 1971)
KJVI, Jackson, Wyoming (now WDPN-TV in Wilmington, Delaware; 1991 to 1996)
KTVN, Reno, Nevada (1967 to 1972)
KTVI, St. Louis, Missouri (1957 to 1995)
KUTV, Salt Lake City, Utah (1954 to 1960)
WCBD, Charleston, South Carolina (1962 to 1996)
WDTN, Dayton, Ohio (1980 to 2004)
WGRZ, Buffalo, New York (1956 to 1958)